Igor Stagljar is a Croatian-born Canadian molecular biologist and an expert in the field of proteomics, cancer cell signalling and COVID-19 serological testing. He is a professor of Molecular Genetics and Biochemistry at Donnelly Centre at the Medical School of the University of Toronto,  and is also a Co-Director and Laboratory Head at the Mediterranean Institute of Life Sciences in Split (Croatia). He received a BSc. (1990) from the University of Zagreb (Croatia), and a Ph.D. (1995) in molecular biology from ETH Zurich (Switzerland).

Stagljar is known for the development and application of numerous techniques in the field of biomedical research, in order to understand how proteins interact with each other to produce either healthy or diseased cell states. Over the years, his lab has made significant contributions in the development and application of interaction proteomics methods such as the split-ubiquitin Membrane Yeast Two-Hybrid (MYTH) Mammalian Membrane Two-Hybrid (MaMTH),  Mammalian Membrane Two-Hybrid Drug Screening (MaMTH-DS),  and Split Intein Mediated Protein Ligation (SIMPL) technologies. This has led to many ground breaking discoveries and the elucidation of functions of various proteins involved in human health and disease. In addition, his lab is developing a novel and proprietary serological test which will help detect, manage and reduce transmission of COVID-19.
During COVID-19 pandemic Stagljar and colleagues recently developed a sensitive and innovative pinprick COVID-19 serological test named SATiN (for (Serological Assay based on split TrIpart Nanoluciferase) that accurately measures in under one hour concentration of coronavirus antibodies in blood of people either infected with SARS-CoV-2 or synthesized in their bodies post vaccination.  SATiN is the first COVID-19 serology test that uses highly sensitive protein complementation chemistry which takes advantage of a modified form of luciferase – an enzyme that gives fireflies their light-emitting power through a biochemical reaction. Furthermore, in collaboration with Shawn Owen’s lab at the University of Utah, Stagljar and colleagues further modified SATiN and developed Neu-SATiN method that can be used to detect the presence and potency of neutralizing antibodies against SARS-CoV-2, including the wild-type and all major variants of concern
Stagljar is a recipient of several prestigious national and international distinctions for his outstanding contributions to biomedicine including the Croatian Biological Society Plaque “Zdravko Lorkovic”, the highest accolade given by the Croatian Biological Society. In 2015, the University of Toronto honoured Igor Stagljar with "Inventor of the Year” award for his contribution to Canada's innovation agenda and the advancement of knowledge. 

In 2022, Stagljar has been elected a member of the European Molecular Biology Organization (EMBO) as well as a  fellow of the Royal Society of Canada, the highest honor that Canadian individuals can achieve in the Arts and Humanities, Social Sciences and Biomedicine

Stagljar is a co-founder of Dualsystems Biotech Inc (Schlieren, Switzerland;) and Perturba Therapeutics (Toronto, Canada).)

References

Academic staff of the University of Toronto
Croatian biochemists
Living people
1966 births
Faculty of Science, University of Zagreb alumni
Scientists from Zagreb